Yirol East County is an administrative area in Lakes State, South Sudan. The county borders Panyijar County in the North, Rumbek East County in the North west, Yirol West County in the west, Awerial County in the south, Bor South County in the south east and Twic East County in the east.

In 2016, Yirol East County was reorganized into four counties, which included the following:

 Adior (Yirol East) County; headquarters: Adior
 Lou County; headquarters: Nyang
 Malek (Ramciel) County; headquarters: Malek
 Yirol North County; headquarters: Yali

List of commissioners of Yirol East county 
Yirol East County was carved out from Yirol County (Yirol West county) in 2005 just after signing of Comprehensive peace agreement. 
The list of commissioners includes;
 Athian Majak Malou 2006-2008
 Santo Mading Domic 2008- 2010
 Bullen Bol Achinbai 15 August 2010- 2012
 Manyang Luk 2012-2015
 Various commissioners ruled when Four counties were created by the time South Sudan was expanded to 32 states namely Yirol East (Adior), Yirol North( Yali), Malek and Nyang, 2 Oct 2015- 22 Feb 2020
 Malual Achiek appointed when South Sudan revert to 10 states and 3 administrative areas as per peace deal with SPLM-IO, 2020- 2022
 Manyang Luk Lueth 2022- incumbent

Payam in Yirol East County 
Yirol East County (YEC) composed of Six payams;
 Adior Payam. 
 Tinagau payam.
 Malek Payam.
 Yali Payam.
 Lak-ha-kudu.
 Pagarau Payam.
 Nyang Town (headquarters)

chiefdoms in Yirol East County (Ciec Manyiel) during colonial era and their leaders
 Ador and Gok chiefdom, their leader (benydit) was Ater Bar.
 Gok chiefdom under Reech Amou.
 Kuac chiefdom under Chep Aciek.
 Ajak chiefdom under Takpiny Malual.
In 1946, British created paramount chief, this creation brought the first two chiefdoms under one chiefdom named Ador and their leader was Anyieth Reech,but later separated in 1976-1977, Ador under Reech Ater later lost to Manyang Jok in local elections and Gok under Dhieu Anyieth later succeeded by his brother Reech Anyieth in 1977.
                      chiefdoms breakdown 1926-1931, before paramount chief created
1 Ador and Gok breakdown
A group of diverse origin united for defensive purposes
Gok (also known as Gok-chiekic)  breakdown into Bwong under Alueth Kwaiwel and Ajwong, Aleu under  Kong Tong whereas 
Ador break down into pirchek (Lok under Ruen Acilik, Ajuot under Mabor Mangwanjok, 
Angar under Thianic Magok) and Dhiim (Abazau under Ut Jok, Dieu under Acek Nyuot)
2           Gok breakdown 
People living in a sandy area inland from kenisa in the East, Keriem in the North,Papiu in the South and Alaakic in the west. Gok has the following breakdown; Lual and Ding under Luk Acok, Doot (buny, Rek, buok, Aparer, Nyiel, Ajueer) under Benydit Reech Amou, Awan (Jaak, Guei Bwonglei) under Malual Abongbar and Ding (Chuor,  Adama, pantong, Tetuiny, Lok, Dhiei) under Matot Achinpuou .
3 Ajak 
Ajak breakdown into Dwaur (Dur under Takpiny Malual and Alak under Deng Ajoin) and Cilik (Payok under Riel Makoi, Padiet under Awan Bolator, Anyon under Ater Mun).
4 kuac chiefdom
kuac break down into Ding( Lith under Chep Achiek, Aliap under Nyiboi Ngong, Agok under Thuom Amok), Cirbek (Naam under Riak Manyang, Aliecho under Caniyang Maiyan, Kun under Kwairot Aciran), Jalwa under Jok Angwac, Nyuiny under Riak Jam, Pakol under Aceng puou, Jaar under Mamair Majok, Pajak (Yom under Jieng Agarak, Dikoic under Ater Aleng, Aliap under Kot Kanj), Ajwuong under Akuc Kacwal.

References

Counties of South Sudan
Lakes (state)